The Church of Light was incorporated  November 2, 1932 in Los Angeles, California. Its mission is  “to teach, practice, and disseminate The Religion of The Stars, a way of life for the Aquarian Age, as set forth in writings of C.C. Zain.”  The Church is the continuation of an earlier initiatic organization, the Brotherhood of  Light, established in the same city in 1915. The 1932 reorganization as The Church of Light was a response to ordinances passed that year by Los Angeles County “prohibiting both the teaching and practice of astrology.”

Brotherhood of Light

The Church is the continuation of an initiatic organization, the Brotherhood of  Light, established also in Los Angeles in 1915. The Brotherhood of  Light lessons, on the three branches of occult science, were written between the spring of 1910 and 1950 by Elbert Benjamine (also known as C.C. Zain, born Benjamin Parker Williams).  Benjamine had been invited in 1909 by the leaders of the Hermetic Brotherhood of Luxor (HBofL) in Denver to join them as successor to Minnie Higgin, who had been the order’s astrologer until her death that year. The surviving Council members  proposed to Benjamine that he rewrite the order’s teachings in a systematic form as the basis for a new organization that would “bring occultism to the life of ordinary people.” This change was inspired by orders from Max Theon to close the Hermetic Brotherhood of Luxor following the death of his wife the previous year. After five years of preparation and study, Elbert Benjamine came to Los Angeles in 1915 and began to hold meetings. “At that point it still operated as a secret society. On November 11, 1918, the Brotherhood of Light opened its doors to the public, offering classes and a home-study course.”

Influences
Astro-Philosophical Publications, founded in Denver in 1892, was a publishing arm of the Hermetic Brotherhood of Luxor created by Henry and Belle Wagner. The authors it published included Thomas H. Burgoyne and Sarah Stanley Grimke, both cited by Benjamine as sources of Brotherhood teachings. He accorded the same status to  Ghost Land and Art Magic by Emma Hardinge Britten.  Another early HBofL member, Genevieve Stebbins, relocated to California from England in 1917 with her husband Norman Astley, and provided assistance to the Benjamines in establishing the Brotherhood of Light.

Founders
The 1932 reorganization as The Church of Light was a response to ordinances passed that year by Los Angeles County “prohibiting both the teaching and practice of astrology.” The three founding officers were

C.C. Zain, pen name of Elbert Benjamine (1882-1951) - President
Fred Skinner (1872-1940) - Vice President
Elizabeth D. Benjamine (1875-1942) - Secretary-Treasurer

Schisms

Following the 1943 remarriage of Elbert Benjamine, his son and heir apparent Will Benjamine departed in acrimony and established the Stellar Ministry, “a short-lived religious group that taught a mixture of Hermeticism and Christianity.”    Another more recent schism in the Church of Light, is the Light of Egypt, headed up by a past president, Linden Liesge.

Activities

The 21 volume Brotherhood of Light lessons are publicly accessible to nonmembers of the church, but only members participate in a system of written examinations covering each volume. Each examination passed advances the member one degree. Seven volumes each are devoted to astrology, alchemy, and magic. Students who complete all 21 degrees (including examinations) are awarded a “Hermetician’s Certificate.”

Church headquarters were located through 1999 at 117 (later 2341) Coral Street in Los Angeles, which had been the home of the Benjamines.  After several years based in Brea, California, in 2005 it relocated to Albuquerque,  New Mexico. Regular classes and services are held at its headquarters, 2119 Gold Avenue, many of which are viewable as live streams and archived on the church website. The current president is Christopher Gibson.

See also

Genevieve Stebbins
Emma Hardinge Britten
Max Theon
Hermetic Brotherhood of Light
Hermetic Order of the Golden Dawn
Esotericism
Theosophy
Occult
Mysticism
Spiritualism

References

Citations

Bibliography
Encyclopedia of Occultism & Parapsychology, 5th ed. (Detroit: Gale, 2000.) "Elbert Benjamine."

Gibson, Christopher, "The Religion of the Stars: The Hermetic Philosophy of C.C. Zain," Gnosis Magazine, Winter 1996

Greer, John Michael, The New Encyclopedia of the Occult.(St. Paul, MN: LLewellyn, 2003)

The Hermetic Brotherhood of Luxor: Initiatic and Historical Documents of an Order of Practical Occultism.Joscelyn Godwin, Christian Chanel, and John Patrick Deveney, eds. (York Beach, ME: Samuel Weiser, 1995)

Horowitz, Mitch, Occult America.  (New York: Bantam, 2009)

Zain, C.C. (Elbert Benjamine), Laws of Occultism. (Los Angeles: The Church of Light, 1994)

Sources
The Church of Light, "Vision for the 21st Century"
The Church of Light, "Where We Are Located."

External links
Church of Light

Esotericism
Hermeticism
Magical organizations
New religious movements
Spiritual organizations